Holden is the given name of:

People
 Holden Bowler (1912–2001), American athlete, singer and businessman
 Holden Furber (1903–1993), American historian and professor
 Holden C. Richardson (1878–1960), pioneer in U.S. naval aviation
 Holden Roberto (1923–2007), founder and leader of the National Liberation Front of Angola
 Holden Thorp (born 1964), American chemist, inventor, musician, professor, and entrepreneur

Fictional characters
 Holden Carver, the main character in the DC Comics/Wildstorm comic book series Sleeper
 Holden Caulfield, the main character in J. D. Salinger's novel The Catcher in the Rye
 Holden Ford, a main character in the TV series Mindhunter
 Holden Matthews, the main character in the TV series Beyond
 Holden McNeil, played by Ben Affleck in three films: Chasing Amy, Jay and Silent Bob Strike Back, and Jay and Silent Bob Reboot
 Holden Snyder, from the soap opera As the World Turns 
 Holden, aka Space Cop, the main character of the 2016 science-fiction action comedy film Space Cop

English masculine given names
English-language masculine given names